In urban public transport, provision is made for standing passengers, often called straphangers or standees, to rationalize operation and to provide extra capacity during rush hour.

Occurrence
On crowded rapid transit urban lines, while most travelers may be seated during off-peak services, only a limited proportion will be seated during the peak services. The longer the journey, the less willing passengers are to stand.  On intercity rail or coach services, the willingness among passengers to stand is often low, or it may even be prohibited, with reserved seating to ensure that all passengers can be seated.

In aviation, safety measures require all passengers and crew to be seated during take-off and landing, so airlines do not allow passengers to travel without a seat. However, in 2010, Ryanair, a low-cost airline proposed a "vertical seat" design for use by standing passengers on its aircraft.

Seated to standing ratio
The seated-to-standing ratio is the ratio between the number of passengers that can be seated and the number of standing passengers on a public transport vehicle. A higher standing ratio allows for more passengers in a given area, but detracts the perceived quality of the transport, in particular over long distances. This metric is normally limited to urban mass transit, due to intercity transport normally only offering seated travel. On longer haul services, bilevel cars are often used to allow for increased seating, though this increases the dwell time at stations, making increased seating ratio versus service time tradeoffs.

Passengers per square metre
Passengers per square metre is a quality of service metric used to determine the standard of comfort provided to standing passengers in a transportation vehicle. Multiplying this number by the total available standing area on a vehicle gives the total standing passenger capacity. Bus services in Europe operate at about four passengers per square metre.

Safety and health
Standing passengers are susceptible to suffering falls and other injuries, particularly elderly people. Shorter people and children may not be able to reach ceiling-mounted handles, straps, or rails. Porous cloth straps are hard to clean, and are being replaced by rubber or plastic straps, and metal fixtures often made of stainless steel.

Handholds

Various types of handholds are provided for standing passengers:
 hanging strap – a strap suspended from the ceiling (often with a handle or a loop)
 grab handle – a pivoted, rigidly-mounted, or suspended handle often mounted above eye level of standing passengers
 handrails – rigid rails running horizontally below the ceiling
 stanchions – vertical poles anchored between the floor and ceiling
 grab rails or grab bars – smaller hand rails attached to seats, doors, and doorways

References

Public transport